Bernard Kipchirchir Lagat (born December 12, 1974) is a Kenyan-American middle and long-distance runner.

Lagat was born in Kapsabet, Kenya.  Prior to his change of domicile to the US, Lagat had an extensive competitive career representing his native country.

He is the American record holder in the 1500 m and mile run indoors, as well as the 1500 m and 3000 m outdoors, and is the Kenyan record holder at 1500 m outdoors. Lagat is the second fastest 1500 m runner of all time, behind Hicham El Guerrouj.

Lagat is a five-time Olympian, having competed in the 2000, 2004, 2008, 2012 and 2016 games, and is a thirteen-time medalist in World Championships and Olympics including five gold medals. At the age of 41, he finished 5th in the finals of the 5000 m at the Rio Olympics.

Lagat's long-term coach is James Li of the University of Arizona, with whom he has worked for over a decade.

Early life 
Lagat was born in Kaptel village, near Kapsabet town in Nandi District of Kenya. He is a Nandi, a sub-tribe of the Kalenjin people.

He graduated from the Kaptel High School in 1994, where he had started his athletic career.  He joined Jomo Kenyatta University of Agriculture and Technology in Nairobi 1996. Later in the same year he moved to Washington State University where other Kenyan athletic greats such as Henry Rono and Michael Kosgei prospered.

In 1998, while at WSU, Lagat won three NCAA individual championships; indoor mile and 3000 m, as well as the 5000 m outdoors.

In 2000, Lagat graduated from Washington State University with a degree in management information systems.

Lagat's siblings have also competed in athletics; his older sister Mary Chepkemboi won the 3000 m at the 1984 African Championships in Athletics, his younger sister Viola Cheptoo placed second in the 2021 New York City Marathon

Representing Kenya (2000–2004) 
Lagat first represented his native Kenya at the 2000 Summer Olympics in Sydney, Australia. In the 1500 m final, Morocco used team tactics to try to ensure a gold medal for heavy favorite Hicham El Guerrouj. In a very close finish, Noah Ngeny took gold, El Guerrouj won silver, and Lagat captured bronze. Lagat finished the year being ranked #3 in the world at 1500 m.

The next summer, Lagat won the silver medal, behind El Guerrouj, at the 2001 World Championships in Athletics, and later that summer, at a meet in Brussels, Lagat set the Kenyan National Record and became the second fastest individual ever at 1500 m when he ran 3:26.34, finishing second in this race behind Hicham El Guerrouj (3:26.13), in an attempt to break El Guerrouj's world record of 3:26.00. Lagat finished the year ranked #2 in the world at 1500 m.

Lagat spent most of 2002 and 2003 chasing El Guerrouj. At the 2003 IAAF World Indoor Championships, he earned the silver medal at 1500 m, this time behind Driss Maazouzi of France. Lagat withdrew from the 2003 world outdoor championships after a blood test showed traces of EPO in his system. His B sample test came back negative, clearing him of any charges. He was ranked 2nd and 4th in the world at 1500 m in 2002 and 2003 respectively.

In the 3000 m at the 2004 IAAF World Indoor Championships Lagat won his first international gold medal. Lagat was clearly overjoyed at his comeback since 2003. Throughout the spring he competed fiercely and beat his rival El Guerrouj in Zurich with a world leading time at 1500 m of 3:27.40. At the 2004 Summer Olympics Lagat seemed poised to once again defeat El Guerrouj. The final saw Lagat and El Guerrouj battling down the final 100 m, swapping the lead multiple times. El Guerrouj prevailed, with Lagat close behind, earning the silver medal, running the final lap in under 52 seconds. He was, however, ranked #1 in the world at 1500 m for the year.

Representing United States (2005–present)

Beginning of American career 
In March 2005, Lagat announced that he had become a naturalized citizen of the United States on May 7, 2004. Lagat did compete for his homeland Kenya in the 2004 Summer Olympics, winning silver in the 1500 m. Even though Kenya did not allow dual citizenship at the time, he was allowed to keep his medal. Lagat became a competitor for the United States but was temporarily banned from international championship events, missing the IAAF World Championships in Helsinki.

The U.S. does allow dual citizenship and consequently races run by Lagat after May 7, 2004, could have been ratified as American records, since USATF rules only state that an athlete has to be a U.S. citizen competing in a sanctioned competition to be eligible to set a national record. However, at the 2005 USATF annual meeting, his 3:27.40 win in the 1500 meters, on August 6, 2004, in Zurich, was not ratified as an American record.

Nevertheless, Lagat owns three American records from races he had run in 2005 that were ratified by USATF. His first American records came indoors, with a 3:49.89 mile at Fayetteville, Arkansas, on February 11, 2005, during which his 1500 meters split time of 3:33.34 also established another new U.S. record, en route to a win in the event. The performance replaced records by Steve Scott, who set the previous American indoor mile record of 3:51.8 in 1981, and the previous American 1500 meter indoor record held by Jeff Atkinson, who ran 3:38.12 in 1989. Lagat's winning time of 3:29.40 at Rieti, Italy, on August 28, 2005, in the outdoor 1500 meters was ratified as his third new American record, improving upon the old record of 3:29.77, set by Sydney Maree in 1985.

Double world champion 
At the 2007 World Championships in Osaka, Lagat surpassed all his previous achievements by becoming the first athlete to become world champion in both the 1,500 m and 5,000 m at the same IAAF World Outdoor Championships. Similar feats were accomplished by Hicham El Guerrouj at the 2004 Olympics and Paavo Nurmi at the 1924 Olympics.

2008 Olympics and 2009 Worlds 

In 2008, Lagat won both 1500 m and 5000 m runs at the US Olympic Trials in Eugene, Oregon, qualifying himself to compete with Team USA at the 2008 Summer Olympics in Beijing, China. Hopes were high that his success in both these events would continue at the Olympics.  However, Lagat failed to advance beyond the semi-finals in the 1500 m run.  He was more successful in the 5000 m run, winning his semi-final heat to advance, but ultimately did not medal, running to ninth-place finish in the finals.

Lagat had concealed the fact that he was running with an injured Achilles tendon, a problem which hampered his training and contributed to his poor showing at the Olympics. He stated that his placings at the 2008 Beijing Games were "the biggest disappointment in my athletics career". The following season, he began with high altitude training in Flagstaff, Arizona. After tying Eamonn Coghlan's record of seven wins in the Wanamaker Mile at the 2009 Millrose Games in New York, Lagat broke Coghlan's record with an 8th win at Millrose in 2010. As the reigning world champion in the 1500 and 5000 meters, he automatically received qualification in the events at the 2009 World Championships in Athletics and set his sights on retaining his titles. Despite being much older than some of his competitors, Lagat's desire to win had not faded and he said "I am more motivated than ever to go to the podium in Berlin". Lagat ultimately won the bronze medal in the 1500 m and the silver medal in the 5000 m.

2010 to present 
Lagat set a new American record in his debut of the indoor 5000 meters at the Reebok Boston Indoor Games on February 6, 2010, with a time of 13:11.50. This beat previous record holder Galen Rupp who had set the record at 13:18.12 in 2009. On June 4, 2010, Lagat broke the American Record for 5000 m with 12:54.12 on June 4, 2010, at the Bislett Games in Oslo. Lagat set another area record at the Rieti IAAF Grand Prix in August: chasing down Tariku Bekele in the 3000 m.  Lagat took second place with an American record of 7:29.00 – his first sub-7:30 minute time.

Lagat broke his own 5000 m American record in July at the Monaco Diamond League meet by running 12:53.60 to finish a close second behind Mo Farah who set the British 5000 m record in this race in a time of 12:53.11. The 2011 World Championships in Athletics, the 5000 m final came down to a sprint finish and Lagat was beaten in the last straight by Mo Farah, leaving Lagat with his second consecutive silver medal at the world event.

The 2012 Millrose Games, was held for the first time at the Armory Track & Field Center and Lagat ran an American indoor record over 5000 m with a time of 13:07.15 minutes. At the 2012 Olympics in London, Lagat finished fourth in the 5000 m race, crossing the line 1.33 seconds behind the leader, Mo Farah, after being tripped up when he was going into his kick by Isiah Kiplangat Koech. Lagat was runner-up behind Matthew Centrowitz Jr. at the Fifth Avenue Mile that year.

Lagat earned his 4th USATF Indoor 3000 meters title on February 22, 2014  On June 27, Lagat, at age 39, won his seventh USA men's 5,000 title.

He made his debut at the 10,000 m on 1 May 2016 and came in first. His winning time of 27:49 seconds made an improvement for the world record in the Masters A40 category by 51 seconds.

On July 9, Lagat won the 5000 meters at the 2016 United States Olympic Trials, qualifying him for his fifth Olympic Games in Rio de Janeiro.  He entered the last lap in sixth place more than two and a half seconds behind race leader Galen Rupp.  At age 41, his final lap was 52.82, the fastest of the field and more than a second faster than any in the 1500 meter final.  Joining Lagat on the team were Somali born Hassan Mead and Kenyan born Paul Chelimo, making for an entirely foreign born delegation. Lagat also became the oldest runner at the Summer Olympics to represent the United States. On August 20, 2016, Lagat initially claimed the 6th-place finish in the 5000 meters at the Olympics. He was moved to bronze after three runners were disqualified, but was moved back to 5th after 2 of the 3 were reinstated. He outsprinted Andrew Butchart of Great Britain, who is 17 years his junior, by more than a second.

Lagat ran his final race as a professional on September 3, 2016, at the ISTAF meet in Berlin where he came in second place in the 3,000 meters.

In May 2017 Lagat served as a pacer for Nike's Breaking2 attempt at achieving a sub-2-hour marathon time. Lagat also agreed to run as a pacer at a similar event, the Ineos 1:59 Challenge, in October 2019.

On September 10, 2017, Lagat finished eighth in the 2017 Great North Run half marathon in 1:03:02.

Lagat participated on his first marathon in New York City Marathon on 4 Nov, 2018 finishing 18th with a time of 2:17:20. He had a lead to the second-placed finisher in his age group of 11:15 minutes.

On 29 February 2020, Lagat placed 18th with a time of 2:14:23 in the Atlanta Olympic Trials Marathon. In preparation he had a 30 km training run with the world record holder Eliud Kipchoge in Kenya.

Lagat lives in Tucson, Arizona and Tübingen, Germany with his wife Gladys Tom (a Canadian of Chinese descent), whom he met while they both attended Washington State University, and their son Miika Kimutai (born in 2006) and daughter Gianna (born 2008).

International competitions 

1Representing Africa
2Representing the Americas

Statistics

Personal bests

Records 

 All of Lagat's American records are also North American Area Records.
His time of 3:26.34 minutes for the 1500 metres, set in 2001, remains the Kenyan and Commonwealth record for the event as well as the third-fastest of all time.
 The 3000 and 5000 marks, set since Lagat turned 35 years of age are also Masters World records and American Masters records.  Lagat also holds the currently recognized Masters World record in the 1500 at 3:32.51 set at Herculis in 2010.
 He set the Masters World record for Age 40 at 3000 m in 7:48.33 on February 7, 2015, in Boston, and rebroke his own record in 7:37.71 on February 25, 2015, in Metz, France.

References

External links 

 
 
 
 
 
 IAAF Focus on Athletes
 NBC Olympics profile
 ESPN profile
 Kenyan-Born Runner Boosts U.S. Olympic Hopes (NPR)
 Flotrack Video Interview of Bernard Lagat

1974 births
Living people
People from Nandi County
American male middle-distance runners
American male long-distance runners
Kenyan male middle-distance runners
Kenyan male long-distance runners
Kenyan emigrants to the United States
Olympic athletes of Kenya
Olympic silver medalists for Kenya
Olympic bronze medalists for Kenya
Olympic silver medalists in athletics (track and field)
Olympic bronze medalists in athletics (track and field)
Athletes (track and field) at the 2000 Summer Olympics
Athletes (track and field) at the 2004 Summer Olympics
Medalists at the 2000 Summer Olympics
Medalists at the 2004 Summer Olympics
Olympic track and field athletes of the United States
Athletes (track and field) at the 2008 Summer Olympics
Athletes (track and field) at the 2012 Summer Olympics
Athletes (track and field) at the 2016 Summer Olympics
Competitors at the 2001 Goodwill Games
Medalists at the 1999 Summer Universiade
World Athletics Championships athletes for Kenya
World Athletics Championships athletes for the United States
World Athletics Championships medalists
World Athletics Championships winners
World Athletics Indoor Championships winners
IAAF Continental Cup winners
Universiade medalists in athletics (track and field)
Universiade gold medalists for Kenya
USA Outdoor Track and Field Championships winners
USA Indoor Track and Field Championships winners
World record holders in masters athletics
Washington State Cougars men's track and field athletes